Wadakkancherry is a major town in Thrissur, Kerala. Up until 1860, this area was part of Chelakkara Taluk. Now, it is the headquarters of Talappilly Taluk.

Wadakkanchery obtained municipality status from the government by merging with the Mundathikode panchayath and it is the only town in Thrissur District to be raised as municipality recently. There are two places with similarly pronounced names: Wadakanchery and Vadakkenchery (the latter is in Palakkad district).

Transportation

Roads and bus 
Wadakkanchery is situated on the Thrissur–Shoranur State Highway 22  and is directly connected to Kunnamkulam (another major town in the Thrissur district). Ottupara Bus Stand is a main stop on the Thrissur–Ottapalam/chelakkara bus route. There has been a huge demand for the last many years to make Thrissur–Perinthalmanna–Nilambur–Ooty or Bangalore a National Highway.

Wadakkanchery is the endpoint of State Highway 50 that connects the town to Chavakkad and Guruvayoor via Kunnamkulam.

Rail 
Wadakanchery Railway Station (alternatively spelled Wadakancheri Railway Station; station code WKI) is located in Wadakancherry and is managed by Southern Railways. Being one status of adarsh station by the government of India, it is the main station after Thrissur Railway station. It has two platforms. Most express trains stop here.

Other nearby railway stations are:
 Vallathole Nagar, 
 Mulankunnathukavu
 Thrissur
 Shoranur Junction
 Cheruthuruthy

Air 
The nearest airports are Cochin International Airport (Nedumabassery airport; code COK), at a distance of 70 km, and Calicut International Airport (Code CCJ).

Culture and education

Wadakanchery is an important cultural centre. The Kerala Kalamandalam is located at Cheruthuruthy, not far from Wadakanchery. This place is home to many artists, literary and cinema figures. Film director P. N. Menon, Bharathan, Kathakali singer Kalamandalam Hyder Ali, film actor Oduvil Unnikrishnan, K.P.A.C Lalitha(Well known Malayalam actress ),Erattakulangara Abubacker, author of the Malayalam version of the "Panchatantram", Sumangala, Malayalam novelist Vilasini വിലാസിനി who wrote the biggest novel അവകാശികൾ are all from Wadakkanchery. The ancient illam Aavanapparambu is near Wadakanchery.

Government Boys' High School, Government Girls' High School, St. Pius, and Bharathiya Vidya Bhavan are the premier schools located at Wadakanchery.

Sri Vyasa NSS College, managed by the Nair Service Society, at Parlikkad is a noted educational institution near Wadakanchery. Parlikkad also hosts a major religious congregation of Hindus during December of every year.

Religion
Many important places of worship are located in the town. These include Uthraalikkaavu temple, Machad thiruvaanikkavu,  Akamala Sastha temple and Maari Amman Kovil, St. Francis Xaviers Forane Church, St. George Malankara Orthodox Syrian Church, India Pentecostal Church of God, Assemblies of God Church,  Ottupara Town Masjid, and Juma Masjid.

The Dhanwanthari Temple at Nelluvay near Erumapetty (on Wadakkanchery–Kunnamkulam Road, approximately 8 km from Wadakkanchery) is another place of religious interest.

The Siva temple at this place is considered an archaeological monument by the Archaeological Survey of India. The Pallimanna Siva Temple at Kumblangad at a distance of 3 km from Wadakanchery is another archaeological monument by the Archaeological Survey of India, famous for the wall paintings in the temple.

The St. Jude Thaddeus Church is located at Kumbalangadu, 3 km away from Wadakkanchery. The carmalamatha church is another famous church nearby, located at Kundannur, 5 km away from Wadakkanchery.

Hindus comprise the majority population in Wadakkanchery. Syrian Christians, with roots in Kunnamkulam side, belonging to both Catholic and Orthodox factions are also present in sizeable numbers. But towards the northern sides of Wadakkanchery from Cheruthuruthi onwards demographic changes are drastic, with increasing Muslim settlement similar to the adjacent Muslim dominated South Malabar.

Hospitals in and around Wadakkanchery 
Hospitals in the town are Wadakanchery district hospital, Divine Hospital and Holly medical centre nearby Ottupara–Vazhani road. There was a huge demand to include Thrissur Medical College and its premises in the Wadakanchery Municipality because some parts belongs to the mundathikode.

The town is covered under all cellular / mobile operators (GSM and CDMA) in Kerala circle.

Wadakkanchery assembly constituency is part of Alathur Lok Sabha constituency. Xavier Chittilappilly is representing the constituency in Niyamasabha

Important Landmarks
 Uthraalikkaavu Temple, Wadakkanchery
 Nelluvai Dhanwathari Temple, Nelluvai
Machad Tiruvaanikkavu Temple,  Thekkumkara
 Akamala Temple, Wadakkanchery
 Kerala Kalamandalam Cheruthuruthy
 Kozhimamparambu temple, Cheruthuruthy 
 Kulasekharanellur siva Temple, Cheruthuruthy
 Vazhani Dam
Asuramkundu Dam, Attoor, Chelakkara
 Vallathole Musium, Cheruthuruthy 
Bharathapuzha
 Poomala Dam and Cheppara
Pathirikkotukavu temple. 
Kodassery mala shivaparvathi temple
Periyammakkavu temple
 Kuttiyankkavu Temple, Minalur
 Cheru chakki chola check dam, Wadakkanchery
 Thoomanam waterfall Wadakkanchery

Suburbs and Villages
 Cheruthuruthy
 Athani, Mulankunnath Kavu and Gramala
 Velappaya, Konchery Road and Thiroor
Mundathikode, thiruthiparambu
Kumaranellur
Thekkumkara
Malakka (Kerala)
Nalamkode

References

External links

 Nearest Railway Station to Wadakanchery

Archaeological sites in Kerala
Cities and towns in Thrissur district